The women's triple jump event at the 1999 Summer Universiade was held on 9 and 11 July at the Estadio Son Moix in Palma de Mallorca, Spain.

Medalists

Results

Qualification
Qualification: 13.80 (Q) or at least 12 best performers (q) advance to the final

Final

References

Athletics at the 1999 Summer Universiade
1999 in women's athletics
1999